Emmalocera stereosticha is a species of snout moth in the genus Emmalocera. It was described by Alfred Jefferis Turner in 1905 and is found in Australia.

References

Moths described in 1905
Emmalocera